The New Zealand Loan and Mercantile Agency Company provided investments and loans for trade and commerce in New Zealand and Australia.

Notable people
 James Beard, the 1889 New Zealand Loan and Mercantile Building architect
 John Logan Campbell, director
 Josiah Firth, with Thomas Russell embarked on a series of large banking and company promotions
 Henry Goulstone, colonial accountant
 Thomas Henderson, helped establish the company
 Thomas Russell, company founder and Minister of Colonial Defence
 James Williamson, company founder and director

Location of former offices 
England
 1, Queen Victoria Street, Mansion House, London
Australia
 Eagle Street, Brisbane, Queensland
 Rockhampton, Queensland
 538 Collins Street (1883) and King Street(1909), Melbourne, Victoria
New Zealand
 Corner of Fryatt and Thomas Burns Streets, Dunedin
 Durham Street, Sydenham, Christchurch

Timeline
 1865 – Incorporated in England.
 1874 – Started business in some Australia States
 1881 – Net Profit £6154
 1889 – The Australian business formed their own board.  Offices in Melbourne, Sydney, Brisbane and Rockhampton 
 1893–95: The Bank of New Zealand, the Colonial Bank of New Zealand and New Zealand Loan and Mercantile Agency Company were involved with a financial crisis causing a national slowdown in private investment.
 1894 – Company reconstructed.
 1952 – Became NZL Properties (Australia) Pty Ltd
 1961 – Merged with Dalgety & New Zealand Loan Ltd
Dalgety went on to be replaced by the contemporary PGG Wrightson

References 

 The Cyclopedia of New Zealand Otago & Southland Provincial Districts

New Zealand stock and station agencies
Defunct companies of the United Kingdom
Defunct companies of New Zealand
Agriculture companies established in the 19th century
Agriculture companies disestablished in the 20th century
New Zealand companies established in 1865